Stanleya elata is a species of flowering plant in the family Brassicaceae known by the common name Panamint princesplume. It is native to the desert mountains of eastern California and western Nevada, where it grows in rocky and scrubby habitat types. It may also occur in Arizona. It is a perennial herb producing one or more erect stems reaching about 1.5 meters in maximum height. They are hairless and often waxy in texture. The thick, leathery leaves have lance-shaped or oblong blades with smooth or toothed edges measuring up to 15 centimeters long. They are borne on petioles. The top of the stem is occupied by a long inflorescence which is a dense, snaking raceme of many flowers. Each flower has four narrow, threadlike yellow or whitish petals each about a centimeter long and a millimeter wide. The fruit is a long, thin, wormlike silique which may be 10 centimeters in length. It contains tiny seeds.

References

External links
Jepson Manual Treatment
UC CalPhotos gallery

Brassicaceae
Flora of the California desert regions
Flora of Arizona
Flora of Nevada
Natural history of the Mojave Desert
Panamint Range
Endemic flora of the United States
Flora without expected TNC conservation status